Fimbristylis costiglumis is a sedge of the family Cyperaceae that is native to the Kimberley region of Western Australia.

References

Plants described in 1915
Flora of Western Australia
costiglumis
Taxa named by Karel Domin